Apidej Sit-Hirun (September 1941 – April 4, 2013), born Narong Yaenprateep, was a famous muay Thai fighter.

Biography and career

Early years
Born in Samut Songkhram, Thailand, Apidej started Muay Thai in his hometown at the age of 8. After 3 months of training he had his first fight in Ratchaburi competing under the name Apidej Lukpornchai (ครูสุพร วงศาโรจน์), he earned 30 baht.

Career
In 1957 he became Apidej Sit-Hirun, he was best known for his powerful kicks. In one fight, he broke both of Sompong Charoenmuang's arms, and forced the fighter to retire. He is considered the hardest kicker in muay Thai history. Apidej simultaneously held no less than seven muay Thai and boxing titles for a period during the 1960s.  Thereafter, he was acclaimed as a national hero and Muay Thai Fighter of the Century by King Bhumibol Adulyadej. After his retirement, Apidej taught as an instructor at the Fairtex school outside Bangkok, Thailand alongside modern champions such as Yodsanklai Fairtex  and Kaew Fairtex.

Death
Apidej died of lung cancer at the age of 72 on April 4, 2013, at Phramongkutklao Hospital, Bangkok.

Championships and accomplishments

Muay Thai
 2× Rajadamnern Stadium 147 lbs Champion (1963, 1968)
 2× Lumpinee Stadium 147 lbs Champion (1964, 1687)
 1964 Thailand 147 lbs Champion

Boxing
Rajadamnern Stadium
 1964 Thailand Welterweight Champion
Lumpinee Stadium
 1964 Thailand Welterweight Champion
Oriental and Pacific Boxing Federation
 1965 OPBF Welterweight Champion

Muay Thai record 

|- style="text-align:center; background:#fbb;"
|1983-07-10
|Loss
| align="left" | Yasunori Suda
|
|Hong Kong
|KO (Punches)
|2
|
|- style="text-align:center; background:#fbb;"
|1978-01-16
|Loss
| align="left" | Chalermchai
|
|Ratchaburi province, Thailand
|TKO (retirement)
|
|

|- style="text-align:center; background:#fbb;"
|1977-03-29
|Loss
| align="left" | Siangow Sitbangprajan
|
|Bangkok, Thailand
|Decision
|5
|3:00

|- style="text-align:center; background:#cfc;"
|1977-
|Win
| align="left" | Changnoi
|
|Bangkok, Thailand
|Decision
|5
|3:00

|- style="text-align:center; background:#fbb;"
|1976-
|Loss
| align="left" | Sirimongkol Luksiripat
|
|Bangkok, Thailand
|TKO (Doctor stoppage)
|2
|

|- style="text-align:center; background:#fbb;"
|1975-10-14
|Loss
| align="left" | Pudpadnoi Worawut
|Lumpinee Stadium
|Bangkok, Thailand
|Decision
|5
|3:00

|- style="text-align:center; background:#cfc;"
|1975-09-15
|Win
| align="left" | Buriram Suanmisakawan
|Rajadamnern Stadium
|Bangkok, Thailand
|Decision
|5
|3:00

|- style="text-align:center; background:#fbb;"
|1975-04-07
|Loss
| align="left" | Satanfah Sor.Prateep
|Rajadamnern Stadium
|Bangkok, Thailand
|Decision
|5
|3:00

|- style="text-align:center; background:#fbb;"
|1975-02-03
|Loss
| align="left" | Khunpon Sakornpitak
|Rajadamnern Stadium
|Bangkok, Thailand
|Decision
|5
|3:00

|- style="text-align:center; background:#cfc;"
|1974-
|Win
| align="left" | Nuapetch Sakornpitak
|
|Bangkok, Thailand
|Decision
|5
|3:00

|- style="text-align:center; background:#cfc;"
|1971-
|Win
| align="left" | Yodthong Saensuek
|
|Bangkok, Thailand
|Decision
|5
|3:00

|- style="text-align:center; background:#cfc;"
|1971-
|Win
| align="left" | Narong Pitsanurachan
|
|Bangkok, Thailand
|Decision
|5
|3:00

|- style="text-align:center; background:#cfc;"
|1970-
|Win
| align="left" | Kongdej Lookbangplasoy
|
|Bangkok, Thailand
|Decision
|5
|3:00

|- style="text-align:center; background:#fbb;"
|1970-
|Loss
| align="left" | Huasai Sitiboonlert
|Lumpinee Stadium
|Bangkok, Thailand
|KO 
|
|

|- style="text-align:center; background:#cfc;"
|1970-05-29
|Win
| align="left" | Dejrit Itthianuchit
|Lumpinee Stadium
|Bangkok, Thailand
|Decision
|5
|3:00

|- style="text-align:center; background:#cfc;"
|1970-02-06
|Win
| align="left" | Huasai Sitiboonlert
|Lumpinee Stadium
|Bangkok, Thailand
|KO (Punch)
|3
|

|- style="text-align:center; background:#fbb;"
|1969-
|Loss
| align="left" | Kongdej Lookbangplasoy
|Huamark Stadium
|Bangkok, Thailand
|KO 
|2
|

|- style="text-align:center; background:#cfc;"
|1969-
|Win
| align="left" | Kongdej Lookbangplasoy
|
|Bangkok, Thailand
|Decision
|5
|3:00

|- style="text-align:center; background:#cfc;"
|1969-08-12
|Win
| align="left" | Phantanan Lukmuangphrae
|Lumpinee Stadium
|Bangkok, Thailand
|Decision
|5
|3:00

|- style="text-align:center; background:#cfc;"
|1969-07-04
|Win
| align="left" | Kongdej Lookbangplasoy
|Lumpinee Stadium
|Bangkok, Thailand
|Decision
|5
|3:00
|-
! style=background:white colspan=9 |

|- style="text-align:center; background:#fbb;"
|1968-11-10
|Loss
| align="left" | Dejrit Itthianuchit
|Charusathian Stadium, Chionoi vs Villacampo
|Bangkok, Thailand
|KO
|1
|0:40
|-
! style=background:white colspan=9 |

|- style="text-align:center; background:#cfc;"
|1968-
|Win
| align="left" | Prabsuk Sakulthai
|
|Bangkok, Thailand
|
|
|

|- style="text-align:center; background:#cfc;"
|1968-09-30
|Win
| align="left" | Monsawan Laemfapah
|Rajadamnern Stadium
|Bangkok, Thailand
|TKO (Referee Stoppage)
|4
|

|- style="text-align:center; background:#cfc;"
|1968-08-21
|Win
| align="left" | Dejrit Itthianuchit
|Rajadamnern Stadium
|Bangkok, Thailand
|Decision
|5
|3:00

|- style="text-align:center; background:#cfc;"
|1968-
|Win
| align="left" | Yodthong Saensuk
|
|Bangkok, Thailand
|
|
|

|- style="text-align:center; background:#fbb;"
|1968-
|Loss
| align="left" | Kongdej Lookbangplasoy
|Rajadamnern Stadium
|Bangkok, Thailand
|KO (Low Kick)
|2
|

|- style="text-align:center; background:#cfc;"
|1968-
|Win
| align="left" | Pannand
|
|Bangkok, Thailand
|
|
|

|- style="text-align:center; background:#cfc;"
|1968-
|Win
| align="left" | Sukkasem Saifalap
|
|Bangkok, Thailand
|Decision
|5
|3:00

|- style="text-align:center; background:#cfc;"
|1968-
|Win
| align="left" | Dejthai Ratchadet
|Rajadamnern Stadium
|Bangkok, Thailand
|
|
|

|- style="text-align:center; background:#cfc;"
|1968-01-15
|Win
| align="left" | Dejrit Itthianuchit
|Rajadamnern Stadium
|Bangkok, Thailand
|KO (Punches)
|3
|
|-
! style=background:white colspan=9 |

|- style="text-align:center; background:#fbb;"
|1967-09-27
|Loss
| align="left" | Dejrit Itthianuchit
|Lumpinee Stadium
|Bangkok, Thailand
|KO
|2
|
|-
! style=background:white colspan=9 |

|- style="text-align:center; background:#cfc;"
|1967-07-03
|Win
| align="left" | Rawee Dechachai
|
|Bangkok, Thailand
|KO (Body Kicks)
|4
|

|- style="text-align:center; background:#cfc;"
|1967-
|Win
| align="left" | Payap Sakulsuk
|Lumpinee Stadium
|Bangkok, Thailand
|
|
|
|-
! style=background:white colspan=9 |

|- style="text-align:center; background:#fbb;"
|1967-04-05
|Loss
| align="left" | Dejrit Itthianuchit
|Rajadamnern Stadium
|Bangkok, Thailand
|TKO
|3
|

|- style="text-align:center; background:#fbb;"
|1966-10-18
|Loss
| align="left" | Danchai Ploenchit
|Lumpinee Stadium
|Bangkok, Thailand
|KO (Low kick)
|2
|
|-
! style=background:white colspan=9 |

|- style="text-align:center; background:#cfc;"
|1966-07-05
|Win
| align="left" | Chakrit Nakornsuk
|Lumpinee Stadium
|Bangkok, Thailand
|KO (Knee to the head)
|2
|

|- style="text-align:center; background:#cfc;"
|1964-11-03
|Win
| align="left" | Dejrit Itthianuchit
|Lumpinee Stadium
|Bangkok, Thailand
|Decision
|5
|3:00
|-
! style=background:white colspan=9 |

|- style="text-align:center; background:#cfc;"
|1964-09-
|Win
| align="left" | Daoprakai Sor.Pinitsak
|
|Bangkok, Thailand
|KO (Kicks)
|3
|

|- style="text-align:center; background:#cfc;"
|1964-08-04
|Win
| align="left" | Dejrit Itthianuchit
|Lumpinee Stadium
|Bangkok, Thailand
|TKO (Doctor stoppage)
|2
|
|-
! style=background:white colspan=9 |

|- style="text-align:center; background:#fbb;"
|1964-02-13
|Loss
| align="left" | Dejrit Itthianuchit
|Rajadamnern Stadium
|Bangkok, Thailand
|Decision
|5
|3:00

|- style="text-align:center; background:#cfc;"
|1963-
|Win
| align="left" | Rakkiat Kiatmuangyom
|Rajadamnern Stadium
|Bangkok, Thailand
|KO
|2
|

|- style="text-align:center; background:#cfc;"
|1963-09-09
|Win
| align="left" | Sornchai Mallayuth
|Rajadamnern Stadium
|Bangkok, Thailand
|Decision
|5
|3:00
|-
! style=background:white colspan=9 |

|- style="text-align:center; background:#cfc;"
|1963-
|Win
| align="left" | Sharksak Klongphajon
|Rajadamnern Stadium
|Bangkok, Thailand
|Decision
|5
|3:00

|- style="text-align:center; background:#cfc;"
|1963-06-06
|Win
| align="left" | Dejrit Itthianuchit
|Rajadamnern Stadium
|Bangkok, Thailand
|Decision
|5
|3:00
|-
! style=background:white colspan=9 |

|- style="text-align:center; background:#cfc;"
|1963-
|Win
| align="left" | Sornchai Mallayuth
|Rajadamnern Stadium
|Bangkok, Thailand
|Decision
|5
|3:00
|-
! style=background:white colspan=9 |

|- style="text-align:center; background:#cfc;"
|1963-02-05
|Win
| align="left" | Sompong Charoenmuang
|Lumpinee Stadium
|Bangkok, Thailand
|TKO (Broken arm)
|2
|3:00
|- style="text-align:center; background:#cfc;"
|1962-
|Win
| align="left" | Sornchai Mallayuth
|Rajadamnern Stadium
|Bangkok, Thailand
|Decision
|5
|3:00

|- style="text-align:center; background:#cfc;"
|1962-09-13
|Win
| align="left" | Adul Srisothorn
|Rajadamnern Stadium
|Bangkok, Thailand
|Decision
|5
|3:00
|-
! style=background:white colspan=9 |

|- style="text-align:center; background:#cfc;"
|1962-
|Win
| align="left" | Suchai Ketsongkram
|Rajadamnern Stadium
|Bangkok, Thailand
|Decision
|5
|3:00

|- style="text-align:center; background:#cfc;"
|1962-04-05
|Win
| align="left" | Srisawad Sit.Sor.Por
|Rajadamnern Stadium
|Bangkok, Thailand
|Decision
|5
|3:00

|- style="text-align:center; background:#cfc;"
|1962-
|Win
| align="left" | Rawee Dechachai
|Rajadamnern Stadium
|Bangkok, Thailand
|Decision
|5
|3:00

|- style="text-align:center; background:#cfc;"
|1961-12-08
|Win
| align="left" | Srisawad Tiamprasit
|Lumpinee Stadium
|Bangkok, Thailand
|KO (Low Kicks)
|3
|

|- style="text-align:center; background:#fbb;"
|1961-10-14
|Loss
| align="left" | Adul Srisothorn
|Rajadamnern Stadium
|Bangkok, Thailand
|KO (Knees)
|4
|
|-
! style=background:white colspan=9 |

|- style="text-align:center; background:#cfc;"
|1961-
|Win
| align="left" | Keowan Yontrakit
|Rajadamnern Stadium
|Bangkok, Thailand
|Decision
|5
|3:00

|- style="text-align:center; background:#cfc;"
|1961-
|Win
| align="left" | Chakaj Poonchai
|
|Bangkok, Thailand
|
|
|

|- style="text-align:center; background:#cfc;"
|1961-
|Win
| align="left" | Danchai Yontarakit
|Lumpinee Stadium
|Bangkok, Thailand
|KO 
|
|

|- style="text-align:center; background:#fbb;"
|1960-09-13
|Loss
| align="left" | Chakaj Poonchai
|Lumpinee Stadium
|Bangkok, Thailand
|KO
|3
|

|- style="text-align:center; background:#fbb;"
|1960-04-16
|Loss
| align="left" | Sinchai RSP
|Lumpinee Stadium Pone Kingpetch vs Pascual Perez
|Bangkok, Thailand
|KO
|
|

|- style="text-align:center; background:#fbb;"
|1960-
|Loss
| align="left" | Kumandej Pitaksamut
|
|Samut Songkhram province, Thailand
|KO (Elbow)
|3
|

|- style="text-align:center; background:#cfc;"
|1960
|Win
| align="left" | 
|
|Bangkok, Thailand
|
|
|

|- style="text-align:center; background:#cfc;"
|1960
|Win
| align="left" | 
|
|Bangkok, Thailand
|
|
|

|- style="text-align:center; background:#cfc;"
|1960
|Win
| align="left" | 
|
|Bangkok, Thailand
|
|
|

|- style="text-align:center; background:#cfc;"
|1959-12-25
|Win
| align="left" | Pansak Vittichai
|Lumpinee Stadium
|Bangkok, Thailand
|KO (High kick)
|1
|
|-
| colspan=8 | Legend:

References

External links
 Interview with Apidej
  Apidej' boxrec.com page (gives his western boxing record only)
 
 

1941 births
2013 deaths
Apidej Sit-Hirun
Muay Thai trainers
Deaths from cancer in Thailand
Apidej Sit-Hirun

Apidej Sit-Hirun